Basketbal Ladies Club Sparta Praha is a women's basketball club from Prague founded in 1939 as a section of omnisport club Sparta Praha.

Sparta was the most successful team in the Czechoslovak Championship with 23 titles between 1948 and 1987, and in 1976 it defeated Clermont UC in the European Cup's final to become the first Czechoslovak team to win the competition, ending the 12-years winning streak of Daugava Riga, which had defeated Sparta in its previous five appearances in the final. Sparta reached the final for the last time in 1978, losing to Geas Basket. The club declined following the dissolution of Czechoslovakia, and currently plays in the second tier.

Coaches and final league standings 
 1947-1954 : Josef Ezr:  5x champion (1948-1950, 1952-1953), 2nd (1951), 4th (1954) 
 1954-1955 : Miloslav Kříž: 5th (1955)
 1955-1957 : Jiří Adamíra: 2x 2nd (1956-1957)
 1957-1964 : Miloslav Kříž: 2 x champion (1958, 1963), 2nd (1964), 3 x 3rd (1959-1961), 6th (1962)
 1964-1965 : Jiří Baumruk: 4th (1965)
 1965-1972 : Zbyněk Kubín: 6 x champion (1966–69, 1971-1972), 2nd (1970)
 1972-1978 : Lubomír Dobrý: 5 x champion (1974-1978), 2nd (1973)
 1978-1981 : Karel Herink: 3 x champion (1979-1981) 
 1981-1987 : Petr Pajkrt: 2 x champion (1986-1987), 3 x 2nd (1982-1984), 3rd (1985)
 1987-1990 : Ludvík Rúžička: 2 x 3rd (1988-1989), 5th (1990)
 1990-1992 : Lubor Blažek: 2nd (1991), 5th (1992)
 1992-1993 : Milena Jindrová: 12th (1993)

Titles 
 European Cup For Women’s Champions Clubs
 1976
 runner-up (6) : 1964, 1967, 1968, 1972, 1975, 1978
 Czechoslovak Championship
 (23) 1948, 1949, 1950, 1952, 1953, 1958, 1963, 1966, 1967, 1968, 1969, 1971, 1972, 1974, 1975, 1976, 1977, 1978, 1979, 1980, 1981, 1986, 1987
 Czechoslovak Cup
 (6) 1964, 1967, 1968, 1972, 1975, 1978

References

External links
 Official website

Sparta Prague
Basketball teams established in 1939
Sparta Prague
Sparta basketball women
1939 establishments in Czechoslovakia